"I Will... But" is a song written by Kristyn Osborn and Jason Deere, and recorded by American country music group SHeDAISY. It was released in March 2000 as the third single from their debut album The Whole SHeBANG.

Content
The title of the album this song was taken from comes from its refrain "I will be the whole shebang". Drums were played by session musician Vinnie Colaiuta, who also performed on "Little Good-Byes". His style when cutting the track gave the feel of a live performance.

Music video
Directed by Shaun Silva, the video for this song is very simple, focusing on the trio at various concerts, as well as black-and-white shots of them doing goofy things. They are also seen performing the song in a parking garage, and while sitting on top of a bar.

Chart performance
It is the highest-peaking single of SHeDAISY's career, reaching number 2 on the U.S. Billboard Hot Country Singles & Tracks chart for 3 weeks, behind "That's the Way" by Jo Dee Messina, as well as being the group's only Top 10 hit in Canada.

Year-end charts

References

2000 singles
1999 songs
SHeDAISY songs
Song recordings produced by Dann Huff
Lyric Street Records singles
Music videos directed by Shaun Silva
Songs written by Jason Deere
Songs written by Kristyn Osborn